The Zimbabwe Women's Bureau (ZWB) is a Zimbabwean women's NGO established in 1978.

ZWB started as an effort by black Rhodesian academics, activists and businesswomen to "raise the awareness of women in the country, especially black women". To escape censorship by the Rhodesian Front, ZWB used churches as meeting places, portraying their activity as prayer groups. After independence, their survey of women's perspectives was published as a book, We Carry A Heavy Load. As a branch of the National Farmer's Association of Zimbabwe, the Women's Bureau sponsored workshops and training sessions for women farmers.

Publications
 Black Women in Zimbabwe. Harare, June 1980
 Kate McCalman, We Carry a Heavy Load: Rural Women in Zimbabwe Speak Out. Harare: Zimbabwe Women's Bureau, 1981
 We Carry a Heavy Load, Part II. Harare: Zimbabwe Women's Bureau, 1992

References

External links
 Zimbabwe Women's Bureau website

1978 establishments in Rhodesia
Women's organisations based in Zimbabwe
Agricultural organisations based in Zimbabwe
Farmers' organizations
Non-profit organizations based in Africa
Women's rights in Zimbabwe